Alive '95 was the first live album by Kai Hansen's Gamma Ray. It was released in May 1996, following the live concerts in Milano, Paris, Madrid, Pamplona and Erlangen, during the band's "Men on a Tour" European tour.

Track listing
CD1
 "Land of the Free" – 5:29
 "Man on a Mission" – 5:54 
 "Rebellion in Dreamland" – 8:24 
 "Space Eater" – 4:45
 "Fairytale" – 0:44
 "Tribute to the Past" – 4:48 
 "Heal Me" – 7:27 
 "The Saviour" – 1:30 
 "Abyss of the Void" – 5:54
 "Ride the Sky" – 5:57 (Helloween cover)
 "Future World" – 7:28 (Helloween cover)
 "Heavy Metal Mania" – 6:27 (Holocaust cover)
 "Lust for Life" (Non-European Bonus) – 6:14

CD2
 "No Return" – 4:03
 "Changes" – 5:23
 "Insanity & Genius" – 4:09
 "Last Before the Storm" – 4:11
 "Future Madhouse" – 4:10
 "Heading for Tomorrow" – 8:17

Credits
Lead Vocals: Kai Hansen (CD1); Ralf Scheepers (CD2)
Guitars: Kai Hansen
Guitars & Keyboards: Dirk Schlächter
Bass Guitars: Jan Rubach
Drums: Thomas Nack

1996 live albums
Gamma Ray (band) albums